Love in a Goldfish Bowl is a 1961 teen film directed by Jack Sher starring singing idols Tommy Sands and Fabian.

Plot
Gordon Slide and Blythe Holloway are two platonic best friends at a college, both from single-parent families. They are so devoted to each other that the headmaster of the school is considering banning them from seeing each other.

Gordon then decides to spend the Easter holiday at his mother's beach pad. Blythe accompanies him, with Gordon impersonating the college headmaster on the phone to Blythe's senator father, so that Blythe gets permission.

Gordon and Blythe settle into a domestic routine. One day they take Gordon's yacht out and get caught in a storm, and the Coast Guard have to rescue them. One of the Coast Guard, Giuseppe, falls for Blythe, which provokes feelings of jealousy in Gordon.

Matters come to a head when Gordon and Blythe have a party. Giuseppe brings along a "fast" girl to set up with Gordon so he can be with Blythe. However this causes Blythe to be jealous. When Giuseppe makes a move on Blythe, she resists. Then another man, a drunken sailor, tries to molest Blythe, but Gordon rescues her.

Gordon and Blythe kiss – only to be busted by his socialite mother and Blythe's father. Everyone has a talk and Gordon's mother and Blythe's father realise how much they have been neglecting their children; they vow to do better. Blythe tells an apologetic Giuseppe that she will continue to write to him.

Blythe and Gordon return to college, now a couple, although the old routines of their relationship are still in play.

Cast
 Tommy Sands as Gordon Slide
 Fabian as Giuseppe La Barba 
 Toby Michaels as Blythe Holloway
 Jan Sterling as Sandra Slide
 Edward Andrews as Clyde Holloway
John McGiver as Dr. Frowley
Majel Barrett as Alice
Shirley O'Hara as Clara Dumont
Robert Patten as Lieut. J. G. Marchon
Phillip Baird as Gregory
Elizabeth MacRae as Jackie
Denny Miller as Oscar Flegler
Susan Silo as Jenny
"Tiger"

Production
The film was originally known as Beach Pad. It was based on an original script by Jack Sher and his cousin Louis Kamp's wife, Irene Kamp, who had worked on Paris Blues together; they sold it to Martin Jurow and Richard Shepherd, the producers of Breakfast at Tiffany's, who had a deal at Paramount.

Shooting started in November 1960 and took place in Hollywood and on location in Balboa.

Fabian and Tommy Sands were both pop stars at the time and both sing in the film. Sands' hair was dyed blonde to differentiate him from Fabian. Sands later said this was "a big mistake. It looked so phony. Fans who knew me knew that was phony."

Songs
"Love in a Goldfish Bowl" by Burt Bacharach and Hal David sung by Tommy Sands (a Capitol Records Release)
"You're Only Young Once" by Russell Faith, Robert Marcucci and Peter De Angelis sung by Fabian (A Chancellor Records Artist)

Reception
The New York Times called the film "vapid and transparent" but that at least it "made no pretenses". Variety called it "strictly teenage fare that misses the mark frequently but has several values that might attract the interest of young people."

Producer Martin Jurow later said the film "didn't come off very well."

According to a review of the film in Diabolique magazine:
It's very possible to do a gay reading of this film, with Sands displaying zero sexual interest in Michaels or any woman throughout the film. Or maybe that's too limiting: because when Fabian puts the hard word on Michaels, she is very coy and not keen at all, despite flirting heavily with him until then. So maybe it's more accurate to describe this movie as being about two people with low sex drives who find each other.

A novelisation of the script was issued in 1961.

References

Citations

Sources

External links

Review of film at New York Times
Copy of novelisation of script at Internet Archive

1961 films
1961 romantic comedy films
1960s teen films
American romantic comedy films
American teen comedy films
Films about the United States Coast Guard
Films about vacationing
Films directed by Jack Sher
Films scored by Jimmie Haskell
Films set in California
Films set on beaches
Paramount Pictures films
Films with screenplays by Jack Sher
1960s English-language films
1960s American films